Karpy was a Spanish professional cycling team that existed from 1967 to 1972.

The team was selected to race in six editions of the Vuelta a España, where they achieved four stage wins.

Major wins
1968
 Vuelta a España
Stages 8 & 18, Manuel Martín Piñera
1969
 Subida a Arrate, Domingo Fernández
 Vuelta a España
Stage 10, Manuel Martín Piñera
1970
 Vuelta a España
Stage 2, 
1971
 Overall Vuelta a Asturias, Eduardo Castelló
 Overall Vuelta a Cantabria, Gonzalo Aja
1972
 Subida a Arrate, Gonzalo Aja

References

Defunct cycling teams based in Spain
1967 establishments in Spain
1972 disestablishments in Spain
Cycling teams established in 1967
Cycling teams disestablished in 1972